Tol-e Gor-e Hajjiabad (also Romanized as Tol-e Gor-e Ḩājjīābād; also known as Ḥājjīābād and Tol-e Gor) is a village in Hamaijan Rural District, Hamaijan District, Sepidan County, Fars Province, Iran. At the 2006 census, its population was 112, in 26 families.

References 

Populated places in Sepidan County